Cryptoblepharus richardsi is a species of lizard in the family Scincidae. The species is endemic to Misima Island in the northwest of Louisiade Archipelago, Papua New Guinea.

Etymology
The specific name, richardsi, is in honor of Australian herpetologist Stephen Richards, who collected the holotype.

Habitat

Description

Reproduction
C. richardsi is oviparous.

References

Further reading
Cogger HG (2014). Reptiles and Amphibians of Australia, Seventh Edition. Clayton, Victoria, Australia: CSIRO Publishing. xxx + 1,033 pp. .
Horner P (2007). "Systematics of the snake-eyed skinks, Cryptoblepharus Wiegmann (Reptilia: Squamata: Scincidae) – an Australian-based review". The Beagle Supplement 3: 21–198. (Cryptoblepharus richardsi, new species).
Wilson, Steve; Swan, Gerry (2013). A Complete Guide to Reptiles of Australia, Fourth Edition. Sydney: New Holland Publishers. 522 pp. .

Cryptoblepharus
Reptiles of Papua New Guinea
Endemic fauna of Papua New Guinea
Reptiles described in 2007
Taxa named by Paul Horner (herpetologist)
Skinks of New Guinea